is a Japanese anime director. In 2004, he joined Sunrise and worked on Mobile Suit Gundam SEED Destiny. After leaving Sunrise, he was put in charge of directing Hyperdimension Neptunia: The Animation in 2013 and Trickster in 2017. Starting with the fourth season, Mukai served as director for the anime adaptation of My Hero Academia.

Biography
Mukai was a fan of the Gundam series in elementary school, which later inspired him to work in the anime industry. He later joined Sunrise and started working on Mobile Suit Gundam SEED Destiny, which was the first series he worked on. After Mukai left Sunrise, he was placed in the lead direction role for the first time with Hyperdimension Neptunia: The Animation in 2013. In 2017, Mukai directed the Trickster anime television series.

In the same year, Mukai served as episode director for the second season of Blood Blockade Battlefront. While working on the series, he was approached by My Hero Academia producer Yoshihiro Ōyabu to serve as director for the series starting with the fourth season, which Mukai accepted.

Works
 Puella Magi Madoka Magica (2011) (episode director)
 Level E (2011) (episode director)
 Hyperdimension Neptunia: The Animation (2013) (director)
 Space Dandy (2014) (episode director)
 Terror in Resonance (2014) (episode director)
 Kamisama Kiss (2015) (episode director)
 Blood Blockade Battlefront (2015–2017) (episode director)
 Trickster (2017–2018) (director)
 Mob Psycho 100 (2019) (storyboard artist)
 My Hero Academia (2019–present) (director)

References

External links
 

Anime directors
Japanese storyboard artists
Japanese television directors
Living people
Sunrise (company) people
Year of birth missing (living people)